The Iglesia de la Agonía is a Roman Catholic church in Alajuela, Costa Rica. Built in 1825, it is an adobe colonial church and is recognisable by its white Spanish style brickwork.

The church contains a small museum of notable religious artwork.

References

Art museums and galleries in Costa Rica
Roman Catholic churches completed in 1825
Christian museums
Buildings and structures in Guanacaste Province
Tourist attractions in Guanacaste Province
19th-century Roman Catholic church buildings in Costa Rica